Qibao is the name of an underground station on Line 9 of the Shanghai Metro. It is located in Qibao, Minhang District, near a popular tourist attraction to the south, Qibao Old Town (from Exit 2).

The station, situated at the crossing point of Caobao Road, a part of Shanghai Highway S124, and Qixin Road, significantly facilitates traveling in the area.

It has become a focal point for the buses that shuttle among nearby residence blocks, since both Qibao Route 2 and Minhang Route 33 (Former Qibao Route 1), two shuttle bus lines in Qibao town, stop at this station.

See also 
 Qibao Old Town
 Qibao

References

Railway stations in Shanghai
Shanghai Metro stations in Minhang District
Railway stations in China opened in 2007
Line 9, Shanghai Metro